SS Bozeman Victory was a Victory ship built during World War II under the Emergency Shipbuilding program. It was built and launched by the Oregon Shipbuilding Corporation on December 9, 1944 and completed on February 17, 1945. The ship's United States Maritime Commission designation was VC2-S-AP3 and hull number 151 (1205). She was built in just 106 days. The Maritime Commission turned it over for Merchant navy operation to a civilian contractor, the Alaska SS Company under the United States Merchant Marine act for the War Shipping Administration. She was named after the city of Bozeman, Montana.

Victory ships were designed to supersede the earlier Liberty ships. Unlike Liberty ships, Victory ships were designed to serve the US Navy after the war and also last longer. The Victory ship differed from a Liberty ship in that they were: faster, longer and wider, taller, and had a thinner stack set farther toward the superstructure. They also had a long raised forecastle.

Christen
Bozeman, Montana City Commission and the War Committee of the Bozeman Chamber of Commerce asked Alice Dahl to christen the SS Bozeman Victory in Portland, Oregon. Alice had helped the war effort by selling bonds, working with the Red Cross and USO. Alice Dahl christened the Bozeman Victory in Portland on December 9, 1944. Alice Dahl was a gold star mom, a mom who had lost sons or daughters in military service during the war.

World War II
Bozeman Victory served as an ammunition ship in the Pacific War. Bozeman Victory departed Mukilteo, Washington with ammunition to supply troops at Okinawa for the Battle of Okinawa. The Battle of Okinawa was 82 days, lasted from April 1 until June 22, 1945. On April 28, 1945 a Japanese assault demolition boat causes extensive damage to Bozeman Victory. US Navy gunboats were credited with keeping the ships at the bay off Okinawa safe. But a Japanese explosive speedboat slipped through. Bozeman Victory was hit at 2:10am while at anchor. Bozeman Victorys hull plates were badly damaged near cargo hold #4. Six crew members were injured in the attack. Some of propeller shaft bearings were cracked in the hit, these immobilized the ship. This damage was bad, but none of the ships cargo, 6,000 tons of ammunition was damaged. The explosive speedboat may have been a kaiten, or a midget submarine.

The loss of the three Victory ships severely hurt the combat forces. The three ships were carrying a total of 24,000 tons (54 million pounds) of ammunition; including most of the 81 mm mortar shells needed for the invasion of Okinawa.

The ammunition ship  arrived April 12, 1945, at Okinawa to replace the ammunition lost on the three ships. Bozeman Victory and Saginaw Victory became the main ammunition ships in the Pacific War. More ammunition ships were not needed as the war came to an end without the invasion of Japan, called Operation Downfall. Forty-seven ships were sunk by kamikaze attack during World War II.

Private use
In 1946 Bozeman Victory was sold to Compañía Argentina de Navegación Dodero, Buenos Aires, Argentina and renamed SS Campero. In 1949 she was sold to Flota Argentina de Navegación de Ultramar, Buenos Aires. In 1961 she was sold to Empresa Líneas Marítimas Argentinas, Buenos Aires. In 1972 she was scrapped at Campana, Argentina.

See also
 List of Victory ships
  also sold to Compana Argentina de Nav. Dodero
 Liberty ship
 Type C1 ship
 Type C2 ship
 Type C3 ship

References

Sources
 Sawyer, L.A. and W.H. Mitchell. Victory ships and tankers: The history of the ‘Victory type" cargo ships and of the tankers built in the United States of America during World War II, Cornell Maritime Press, 1974, 0-87033-182-5.
 United States Maritime Commission: 
 Victory Cargo Ships 

Victory ships
Ships built in Portland, Oregon
Merchant ships of the United States
1945 ships
World War II merchant ships of the United States